Henry Courtenay Hawtrey  (29 June 1882 – 16 November 1961) was a British track and field athlete, winner of  run at the 1906 Summer Olympics. He was born in Southampton and died in Aldershot.

The British were the leading force in the long-distance running in early 1900s. Although the most celebrated long-distance runner Alfred Shrubb had turned to professional just before the 1906 "intercalated" Olympics of, the Britons sent a very good team to Athens.

The Britons used good teamwork to aid Hawtrey to win, as third-placed Irishman John Daly was disqualified because he blocked the Swedish runner's way several times.

Hawtrey served with the Royal Engineers in the First World War. He was awarded the Distinguished Service Order and made a Companion of the Order of St Michael and St George in the 1918 New Year Honours.

References

External links
 

1882 births
1961 deaths
Sportspeople from Southampton
Olympic athletes of Great Britain
Athletes (track and field) at the 1906 Intercalated Games
Olympic gold medallists for Great Britain
English male long-distance runners
Companions of the Order of St Michael and St George
Companions of the Distinguished Service Order
British Army personnel of World War I
Medalists at the 1906 Intercalated Games
Royal Engineers officers